Paul Billik (1891-1926) was a German First World War fighter ace credited with 31 confirmed aerial victories. He scored his first four aerial victories with Jagdstaffel 12. Transferred to another fighter squadron, Jagdstaffel 7, he shot down four more enemy airplanes, to end 1917 with eight victories. Promoted to command of Jagdstaffel 52 on 28 December 1917, he would score 23 more aerial victories while leading this squadron, until he was shot down and taken prisoner on 10 August 1918.

The victory list

Paul Billik's victories are reported in chronological order, which is not necessarily the order or dates the victories were confirmed by headquarters.
This list is complete for entries, though obviously not for all details. Background data was abstracted from Above the Lines: The Aces and Fighter Units of the German Air Service, Naval Air Service and Flanders Marine Corps, 1914–1918, p. 74; and The Aerodrome webpage on Paul Billik . Added facts are individually cited. Abbreviations were expanded by the editor creating this list.

Endnotes

References

 

Aerial victories of Billik, Paul
Billik, Paul